The 1995 CONCACAF Cup Winners Cup was the fourth edition of this defunct tournament contended between 1991 and 1998.

Preliminary round

North American Zone 
 Greek Americans withdrew, so  UAG qualified for Final Round.

Central American Zone A

Luis Ángel Firpo qualified for Final Round.

Central American Zone B

First round

Second round

Marathón qualified for Final Round.

Caribbean Zone

First round

 FICA withdrew, so  Western Tigers FC qualified.

Second round

 Robert withdrew, so  Western Tigers FC qualified.

 Jong Colombia qualified for Final Round.

Final Round

Semifinals

Third Place

Final

Champion

References 

2
CONCACAF Cup Winners Cup